Talk Memphis may refer to:
Talk Memphis, a 2007 album by Toni Price
Talk Memphis, an album by Jesse Winchester from which Price's album gets its name